PSGR Krishnammal College for Women, is an autonomous arts and science college located in Coimbatore, Tamil Nadu. India. It has been recognized as the 'College of Excellence' by the University Grants Commission.

History
PSGR Krishnammal College for Women was established in 1963 under the GRG Trust, founded by Sri G.R. Govindarajulu and Smt. Chandrakanthi Govindarajulu with a motto of 'empowering women through education', initially affiliated to the University of Madras.

Rankings 

The college has been ranked sixth among the colleges in India in the National Institutional Ranking Framework (NIRF) ranking of 2022.

Academics
The college offers undergraduate, graduate and doctoral degrees in arts, science, commerce, computer science, and management. It has global collaborative agreements with Oregon State University, San Diego State University & Toledo University, USA; Universiti Malaysia Pahang, Malaysia; Nottingham Trent University, UK; CETYS University, Mexico; and Swinburne University, Australia.

References

External links

Educational institutions established in 1963
1963 establishments in Madras State
Colleges affiliated to Bharathiar University
Academic institutions formerly affiliated with the University of Madras